Cyttus is the sole genus in the family Cyttidae a family of large, showy, deep-bodied zeiform marine fish. Members of this genus are found in the Atlantic, Indian, and Pacific Ocean.

Species 
There are currently three recognized species in this genus:
 Cyttus australis (J. Richardson, 1843) (silver dory)
 Cyttus novaezealandiae (Arthur, 1885) (New Zealand dory)
 Cyttus traversi F. W. Hutton, 1872 (king dory)

References 

Ray-finned fish genera
Taxa named by Albert Günther